Mehmet Erol Evgin (born 16 April 1947) is a Turkish singer, composer and film actor.

Biography
Erol Evgin was born in Istanbul, Turkey in 1947. He finished his high school education in Istanbul High School in 1965. He then studied architecture in Mimar Sinan Fine Arts University. In his musical career, he generally worked in collaboration with the composers Çiğdem Talu and Melih Kibar.

Discography

Studio albums
 İşte Öyle Bir Şey (1977)
 Erol Evgin 79 (1979)
 Erol Evgin ve Renkli Dünyası (1981)
 Erol Evgin 84 (1984)
 Yeni Bir Gün Doğarken (1985)
 Lades (1986)
 Erol Evgin 88 (1988)
 Erol Evgin ile Yeniden (1991)
 Sen Unutulacak Kadın Mısın? (1997)
 İbadetim (2003)
 İşte Öyle Bir Şey: Melih Kibar – Çiğdem Talu Şarkıları (1976–1980) (2005)
 Tüm Bir Yaşam: Melih Kibar – Çiğdem Talu Şarkıları (1980–1983) (2006)
 Hep Böyle Kal – 40 Yıl 40 Şarkı (2009)
 Gözbebeğim Sen Çok Yaşa (2011)
 Altın Düetler (2016)
 Altın Düetler 2 (2019)
 Sevdiklerim (2021)

45rpms and singles 
 Sen – Eski Günler (1969)
 İstemesen de – Aşk Başlarken (1970)
 Bir Gün Biter – Söyleme (1970)
 Her Akşam – Unutma Sen (1970)
 Gurbet Türküsü – Deli Gönül (1972)
 Karacaoğlan der ki – Aç Yüzünü Göreyim (1972)
 Garip Gönlüm Olmuş Deli – Bulmak İsterim Seni (1973)
 Geli Geliver – Sen Varsın ya (1974)
 Bir Yıldız Doğdu Yüceden – Koş Gel Desen Kollarıma (1974)
 Gel de Yanma – Efkar (1975)
 Şoför Mehmet – Tanrım Bu Hasret Bitse (1976)
 İşte Öyle Bir Şey – Sevdan Olmasa (1976)
 Bir de Bana Sor – Etme Eyleme (1977)
 İçimdeki Fırtına – Yine de Güzeldir Yaşamak (1978)
 Aldım Başımı Gidiyorum – Kader Utansın (1979)
 Söyle Canım – Hep Böyle Kal (1980)
 Söyle Canım (2001)
 Yeni Yıla Sensiz Giriyorum – Sensiz Olmuyor (2010)

Filmography
 Meryem ve Oğulları (1977)
 Renkli Dünya (1980)
 1985 – Bir İlkbahar Sabahı 
 1988 – Hisseli Harikalar Kumpanyası

See also
 Music of Turkey
 Turkish pop music

References

Sources
 Who is Who Database – Biography of Erol Evgin 
 EMI Music Turkey – Albums of Erol Evgin 
 Amazon.com – Selected discography of Erol Evgin. Accessed 17 February 2009.

External links
 
 

1947 births
Living people
Istanbul High School alumni
Singers from Istanbul
Turkish male film actors
Turkish pop singers
Turkish male singers
Turkish male television actors